"No Lies" is the debut single by Australian rock-pop band Noiseworks. It was released in 1986 as the first single from their first studio album Noiseworks (1987) and peaked at number 31 on the Australian Kent Music Report.

Track listing
7" (BA 3489)

Charts

External links
 https://www.discogs.com/Noiseworks-No-Lies/master/136042

References

Noiseworks songs
1986 debut singles
1986 singles
CBS Records singles
Songs written by Jon Stevens
Black-and-white music videos
Song recordings produced by Mark Opitz